Navata is a municipality in the comarca of Alt Empordà, province of Girona, Catalonia, Spain.

References

External links
 Government data pages 

Municipalities in Alt Empordà
Populated places in Alt Empordà